Juul is an electronic cigarette company. 

Juul may also refer to:

 Juul (given name)
 Juul (surname)
 Juhl (surname), also spelled as "Juul"
 Juul's House, Aarhus, Denmark; a building constructed in 1629
 An Old Norse name for Yule

See also
Jouault
Jugul
Juuliku
Jul (disambiguation)
Juel (disambiguation)
Jewel (disambiguation)
Joule (disambiguation)